Mark Allen Totten is an American lawyer who has served as the United States attorney for the Western District of Michigan since 2022.

Early life and education 

A native of Kalamazoo, Michigan, Totten attended the Kalamazoo Public Schools. He earned a Bachelor of Arts degree in communications from Cedarville University in 1996, a Juris Doctor from Yale Law School, and a PhD in ethics from Yale University.

Career 

In 2007 and 2008, Totten served as a law clerk for Judge Thomas B. Griffith of the United States Court of Appeals for the District of Columbia Circuit. He also worked as an appellate staffer in the United States Department of Justice Civil Rights Division. From 2011 to 2013, he served as special assistant United States attorney in the United States Attorney's Office for the Western District of Michigan. Totten was the Democratic nominee in the 2014 Michigan Attorney General election, losing to incumbent Bill Schuette.

In 2016 and 2017, Totten was an assistant prosecuting attorney in the Office of the Genesee County Prosecuting Attorney. From 2008 to 2018, he was a professor at the Michigan State University College of Law. Since 2019, Totten has served as chief legal counsel to Michigan Governor Gretchen Whitmer.

U.S. attorney for the Western District of Michigan 

On November 12, 2021, President Joe Biden announced his intent to nominate Totten to serve as the United States attorney for the Western District of Michigan. On November 15, 2021, his nomination was sent to the United States Senate. On January 13, 2022, his nomination was reported out of the Senate Judiciary Committee. On April 27, 2022, his nomination was confirmed in the Senate by voice vote. He was sworn in on May 5, 2022.

Personal life 

Totten and his wife, Kristin, have two children. Kristin Totten is an education attorney for the American Civil Liberties Union (ACLU) of Michigan who has represented children in Flint, Michigan, who were affected by contaminated water in the city.

References

External links

Living people
Year of birth missing (living people)
Cedarville University alumni
Michigan Democrats
Michigan lawyers
Michigan State University faculty
People from Kalamazoo, Michigan
United States Attorneys for the Western District of Michigan
Yale Law School alumni